The Cedar Mountain Formation is the name given to a distinctive sedimentary geologic formation in eastern Utah, spanning most of the early and mid-Cretaceous. The formation was named for Cedar Mountain in northern Emery County, Utah, where William Lee Stokes first studied the exposures in 1944.

Geology

The formation occurs between the underlying Morrison Formation and overlying Naturita Formation (sometimes formerly called the Dakota Formation).

It is composed of non-marine sediments, that is, sediments deposited in rivers, lakes and on flood plains. Based on various fossils and radiometric dates, the Cedar Mountain Formation was deposited during the last half of the Early Cretaceous Epoch, about 127 - 98 million years ago (mya).

It has lithography similar to the Burro Canyon Formation in the region.

Dinosaur fossils occur throughout the formation, but their study has only occurred since the early 1990s. The dinosaurs in the lower part of the formation differ from those in the upper part. These two dinosaur assemblages, characterized by distinct dinosaurs, show the replacement of older, European-like dinosaurs with younger, Asian-like dinosaurs as the North American Continental Plate drifted westward. A middle dinosaur assemblage may be present, but the fossil record is not clear.

Stratigraphy
The Cedar Mountain Formation is sandwiched between the Morrison Formation below and the Naturita Formation and Mancos Shale above. The youngest date for Morrison just below the Cedar Mountain Formation is 148.1 ± 0.5 Ma . or lower Tithonian.  Typically, the Jurassic-Cretaceous boundary in western North America is marked by an unconformity of variable length, and typically signifies 10-49 million years of missing geologic time. This boundary between the Morrison and Cedar Mountain is commonly marked by a horizon of carbonate nodules or by highly polished pebbles that are allegedly gastroliths.

Although not part of the Cedar Mountain Formation, the Naturita Formation immediately overlies the Cedar Mountain and marks the encroaching Western Interior Seaway. The Naturita is not uniformly distributed and was eroded away in places by the advancing Seaway so that the marine shales of the Mancos Formation lay directly on the Mussentuchit or its equivalent. The name Dakota Formation has been improperly used for these strata.

Formation members
Only recently did the 125 m (410 ft) thick formation get subdivided into smaller, distinctive beds called members. There is a debate as to whether there are five members or four depending whether the Buckhorn Conglomerate is considered to be at the top of the Morrison Formation or at the base of the Cedar Mountain Formation; most geologists and paleontologists consider it part of the Cedar Mountain Formation. In ascending order the remaining members are the Yellow Cat Member, Poison Strip Sandstone, Ruby Ranch Member, and the Mussentuchit Member. Each of these members are named after a geographic area where they were first studied.

 The Buckhorn Conglomerate is considered the lowermost member of the Cedar Mountain Formation in the region of the San Raphael Swell by Stokes. It is named for exposures near Buckhorn Reservoir near Cedar Mountain. Its position immediately below the Ruby Ranch Member suggests that it may be equivalent to the channel sandstones in the Yellow Cat Member and the Poison Strip Sandstone farther to the east. This idea is strengthened by the similar composition of the gravels in these members, but a direct correlation has not yet been established.
The Yellow Cat Member is named for exposures near the Yellow Cat mining area north of Arches National Park. It is limited to the eastern portions of the formation and is thickest near Arches National Monument. The member is composed of drab greyish mudstones and some lenses of sandstone. The mudstones were deposited on flood plains, and show evidence of ancient soil development called paleosols. The mudstones originated as flood deposits from river channels that are marked by the sandstone lenses. Formerly considered Barremian, the latest radiometric and paleopalynological studies conclude that the Yellow Member is older, with deposition occurring from the middle Berriasian to early Hauterivian stages.
 The Poison Strip Sandstone was named for prominent, cliff-forming sandstones in the Poison Strip uranium district north of Arches National Monument. It is actually a series of sandstones that were deposited in river channels, and lesser amounts of mudstones and limestones that were deposited on the flood plain and small ponds. The  Poison Strip Sandstone may represent a meandering river complex. Based on the position of the Poison Strip between the Yellow Cat and Ruby Ranch members, it probably was latest Barremian to earliest Aptian. Carbonate growths appear on bones in the quarry from which Venenosaurus was extracted.
 The Poison Strip Sandstone was the source of Tony's Bone Bed, a significant concentration of dinosaur bones. Before it was discovered, only possible Sauropelta remains and the isolated bones of sauropods and theropods had been recovered from the Poison Strip member. Volunteers from the Denver Museum of Natural History discovered Tony's Bone Bed in 1998, 3.75m below the top of the member. The quality of the preserved remains in Tony's Bone Bed are "highly variable". The condition of many of its fossils suggest the deposit accumulated gradually. Many of the bones seem to have been trampled before burial, and some of the ends of bones are missing and were likely removed by scavengers. None of the bones were preserved articulated with each other. All of this suggests a significant period of time between the deaths of the animals and their final entombment. Tony's Bonebed probably accumulated over time when the water in the river channel was low during the dry season.

The Ruby Ranch Member is the most widespread and distinctive member of the Cedar Mountain. It was named for exposures on the Ruby Ranch located southeast of Green River, Utah. The member is composed of maroon mudstones with irregular spheres of carbonate nodules. The nodules formed in ancient soils that developed in the mud deposited on the flood plain in a strongly seasonal, semiarid climate. Evaporation of groundwater during the dry season concentrated calcium carbonate and other minerals in the upper parts of the soil horizon. Radiometric dates place the upper portions of the Ruby Ranch in the late Aptian. Exhumed river channels in the Ruby Ranch indicate that stream flow during the Aptian was towards the northeast, the direction of the encroaching Western Interior Seaway.
The Mussentuchit Member is the uppermost member of the Cedar Mountain Formation. It was named for exposures along Mussentuchit Wash southwest of the San Rafael Swell. It is predominantly composed of grey mudstones high in organic carbon from fossil plant material, as well as volcanic ash. The mudstones were originally deposited on a broad coastal plain with a high water table or with abundant rainfall. Thus, carbonate nodules are rare. A radiometric date of 98.37 ± 0.07 Ma places the upper part of the member in the Lower Cenomanian, while lower portions of the member have been dated to 104.46 ± 0.95 Ma, in the Albian stage.

Fossil content
The Cedar Mountain Formation is proving to contain one of the richest and most diverse Early Cretaceous dinosaur faunas in the world. The discoveries to date have revealed that the origin of some of the later Cretaceous dinosaurs may lie in the Cedar Mountain, but further work is needed to understand the timing and effects the changing position of the North American Plate had on dinosaurian evolution. Also needed is a better understanding of the effects that the changing North American Plate had on the non-dinosaur vertebrates.

Dinosaurs

The Cedar Mountain Formation is one of the last major dinosaur-bearing formations to be studied in the United States. Although sporadic bone fragments were known prior to 1990, serious research did not begin until that year. Since then, several organizations have conducted field work collecting dinosaurs, chiefly the Oklahoma Museum of Natural History, the Denver Museum of Nature & Science, the College of Eastern Utah, the Utah Geological Survey, Brigham Young University, and Dinosaur National Monument staff. This research indicates that at least two, possibly three dinosaur assemblages are contained within the formation.

The oldest of these assemblages is from the Yellow Cat, Poison Strip and basal Ruby Ranch members. The small, Ornitholestes-like theropod Nedcolbertia and the brachiosaurid sauropod Cedarosaurus may be considered as relics, with their closest relatives in the Morrison Formation. In contrast, the polacanthid ankylosaur Gastonia and a yet unnamed iguanodontid are similar to related forms from the Lower Cretaceous of southern England. These dinosaurs show that the connection between North America and Europe still existed during the Barremian. All of this changes, however, with the upper dinosaur assemblage from the top of the Ruby Ranch and Mussentuchit members. This upper assemblage shows greater similarities with Asian dinosaur assemblages from the same time. The upper assemblage also has a tyrannosauroid, a ceratopsian, and a pachycephalosaur. Although not a dinosaur, the primitive mammal Gobiconodon is known from both Mongolia and the Mussentuchit Member. Evidence for a middle dinosaur assemblage between the older and younger ones is controversial because the evidence mostly depends on a single specimen of the ornithopod Tenontosaurus from high in the Ruby Ranch Member and the sauropod Astrodon from low in the Ruby Ranch. Regardless, the upper and lower dinosaur assemblages in the Cedar Mountain Formation document the separation of North America and Europe, the westward drift of North America, and its connection with Asia 10 to 15 million years later.

Data from Carpenter (2006), Cifelli et al. (1999), Kirkland and Madsen (2007), and The Paleobiology Database.

Ankylosaurs

Neornithischians
A large sail-backed iguanodont represented by large vertebrae and fragmentary remains from the Upper Yellow Cat Member.

Sauropods

Theropods
Indeterminate allosauroid material present in the Lower Yellow Cat and Ruby Ranch Members. Indeterminate dromaeosaurine present in the Mussentuchit Member. Indeterminate deinonychosaurian remains present in the Mussentuchit member. Indeterminate velociraptorine remains present in the Mussentuchit Member. Indeterminate troodontid remains present in the Mussentuchit Member. Indeterminate therizinosaurid remains present in the Mussentuchit Member. Indeterminate dromaeosaurine remains present in the Mussentuchit Member. Possible indeterminate hesperornithiformes present in the Mussentuchit Member.

Other vertebrate fossils

Besides dinosaurs, the Cedar Mountain Formation has produced a wealth of small fossils (a.k.a. microfossils), mostly teeth from a variety of vertebrates. Most of these specimens have been found in the Mussentuchit Member where they are collected by washing the rock through fine window screen. The teeth and other small fossils are picked from the residue.

 Fish include primitive fresh or brackish water sharks (e.g., Hybodus) and rays (c.f., Ischyrhiza), the lungfish (Ceratodus) and several bony fishes known from vertebrae. Lungfish are able to breathe air when pond water becomes poorly oxygenated, such as during the dry season.
 Amphibians include both salamanders (e.g. Albanerpeton) and frogs, but neither is common.
 Reptiles are more abundant and better studied. These include aquatic turtles (Glyptops, Naomichelys), at least one type of snake (Coniophis), and several different lizards, including teiids (Bicuspidon), possible skinks and some extinct families (e.g., Paramacellodidae). Crocodiles are also present but their remains are fragmentary. They include Bernissartia, an unnamed atoposaurid, and unnamed pholidosaurid. At least one fragment of a large pterosaur is known from the base of the Mussentuchut Member. Unfortunately, it is too incomplete to identify to family or genus.
 Bird remains are very fragmentary because of their delicate structure. At least one aquatic bird is known. Based on the diversity of birds from the Early Cretaceous of China, other birds were probably present in Utah at this time as well.
 Mammals are the most thoroughly studied thanks to the work of Jeffrey Eaton and Richard Cifelli. They include triconodonts (e.g., Astroconodon), which have the molar cusps arranged in a single row; symmetrodonts (e.g., Spalacolestes; Spalacotheridium), characterized by molars having three cusps arranged in a triangle; multituberculates (e.g., Janumys; Cedaromys; Paxacimexomys), with their multiple rows of cusps on the molars; one of the earliest marsupials (Kokopellia), and several unnamed tribotheres, characterized by molars having three cusps that are typically asymmetrically arranged.

The various vertebrates are listed by member in the list below.

Non-vertebrate fossils are more widely distributed in the Cedar Mountain Formation. These include the distinctive reproductive structures of fresh water algae that are called charophytes. Charophytes are so distinctive that they are used to correlate strata of similar age, and thus were used to show that the Yellow Cat Member was time equivalent to Barremian age strata in England. Ostracods, small crustaceans with clam-like shells, also occur in fresh water deposits, along with "finger-clams" or conchostracans. Pollen have been found in the Mussentuchit Member and are important for reconstructing the environment. In a few places, large petrified logs are known, especially from the Poison Strip. These conifer logs are over a meter in diameter and indicate the presence of trees over 30 m (100 feet). The distinct wood of the tree fern Tempskya is occasional found as well.

Data from Carpenter (2006), Cifelli et al. (1999), Kirkland and Madsen (2007), and The Paleobiology Database.

Other reptiles
Indeterminate isolated pterosaur remains have been recovered from the Yellow Cat and Mussentuchit Members.

A partial neochoristodere femur is known from the Yellow Cat Member.

Crurotarsans
Indeterminate crocodilian remains present in the Yellow Cat and Ruby Ranch Members. Indeterminate pholidosaurid remains present in the Mussentuchit Member. Indeterminate atoposaurid remains present in the Mussentuchit Member.

Lepidosaurs

Turtles
Indeterminate baenid remains present in the Mussentuchit Member.

Amphibians
Indeterminate anuran remains present in the Mussentuchit Member.

Fish

Bony fish
Indeterminate amiiform present in the Yellow Cat and Mussentuchit Members. Indeterminate neopterygian remains present in the Mussentuchit Member. Possible indeterminate pycnodontid remains present in the Mussentuchit Member. Possible indeterminate lepisosteid remains present in the Mussentuchit Member.

Cartilaginous fish
A new genus and species of orectolobid present in the Mussentuchit Member.

Mammaliaformes
New genus and species of pappotheriid present in the Mussentuchit Member. Indeterminate genus and species  of picopsid present in the Mussentuchit Member.

See also 

 List of dinosaur-bearing rock formations

References

Bibliography and further reading

Further reading

External links 
 Dinosaurs of the Cedar Mountain Formation presented by the Utah Geological Survey
 Utah's Newly Recognized Dinosaur Record from the Early Cretaceous Cedar Mountain Formation

Geologic formations of Utah
Lower Cretaceous Series of North America
Early Cretaceous North America
Cretaceous geology of Utah
Albian Stage
Aptian Stage
Barremian Stage
Cenomanian Stage
Conglomerate formations
Mudstone formations
Sandstone formations of the United States
Fluvial deposits
Fossiliferous stratigraphic units of North America
Paleontology in Utah
Emery County, Utah